Philip Richard McDevitt (July 12, 1858 – November 11, 1935) was an American prelate of the Roman Catholic Church. He served as bishop of the Diocese of Harrisburg in Pennsylvania from 1916 until his death.

Biography

Early life 

Philip McDevitt was born on July 12, 1858, in Philadelphia to Richard and Mary Ann (née Dinneney) McDevitt. After graduating from La Salle College High School in 1877, he studied at La Salle College and St. Charles Borromeo Seminary, both in Philadelphia. 

McDevitt was ordained to the priesthood for the  Archdiocese of Philadelphia by Archbishop Patrick Ryan on July 14, 1885. He served as a curate at the Church of the Nativity of the Blessed Virgin Mary Parish in Port Richmond, Philadelphia, before becoming superintendent of Catholic schools in the archdiocese in 1899. In this position, he gained a national reputation as an educator and administrator. McDevitt was named  domestic prelate by Pope Pius X on July 16, 1910.

Bishop of Harrisburg 
On July 10, 1916, McDevitt was appointed the fourth bishop of the Diocese of Harrisburg by Pope Benedict XV. He received his episcopal consecration on September 21, 1916, from Archbishop Edmond Francis Prendergast, with Bishops John McCort and John Fitzmaurice serving as co-consecrators. 

During his 19-year tenure, McDevitt established ten parishes and twelve schools. In 1925, he created the Mission Board to respond to financial needs caused by the Great Depression. He also served as chair of the Catholic Press Department within the National Catholic Welfare Conference, and president of the American Catholic Historical Association.

Death and legacy
McDevitt died on November 11, 1935, at age 77 and is buried at Holy Cross Cemetery in Harrisburg. Bishop McDevitt High School in Harrisburg and Bishop McDevitt High School in Wyncote, Pennsylvania, are both named in his honor.

References

External links

1858 births
1935 deaths
St. Charles Borromeo Seminary alumni
Clergy from Philadelphia
Roman Catholic bishops of Harrisburg
20th-century Roman Catholic bishops in the United States